The city of Ottawa, Canada held municipal elections on December 4, 1944.

Mayor of Ottawa

Referendums
(Only property owners could vote in the referendums)

Ottawa Board of Control
(4 elected)

Ottawa City Council
(2 elected from each ward)

References
Ottawa Citizen, December 5, 1944

Municipal elections in Ottawa
1944 elections in Canada
1940s in Ottawa
1944 in Ontario
December 1944 events